The National Federation of Workers (NFW) was a national trade union federation in South Africa.

The federation was established in 1980, as a split from the Black Allied Workers' Union.  Based in Durban, it was led by Matthew Oliphant and Themba Nxumalo, both of whom were also linked with the banned South African Congress of Trade Unions.  By 1985, the federation had the following affiliates:

NISMAWU left the federation early in the year.  In November 1985, the federation dissolved itself into the new Congress of South African Trade Unions, with NISMAWU also joining the new federation.

References

National trade union centres of South Africa
Trade unions established in 1980
Trade unions disestablished in 1985